Buyo may refer to:
 Buyō, traditional Japanese performing art of dance and mime
 Buyo, Ivory Coast, a town in Haut-Sassandra region
 Lake Buyo, an artificial lake near the town
 Francisco Buyo (Paco Buyo, 1958–), Spanish footballer
 Buyo, Polangui, a barangay in the Philippines.